Ikyawann ( Fifty-One) is an Indian television series, which was broadcast on Star Plus and streamed on Hotstar. It premiered on 13 November 2017. The show starred Namish Taneja and Prachi Tehlan. The show is set in Ahmedabad, and produced by Suzana Ghai. It was replaced by A Game Show named Sabse Smart Kaun from 4 June 2018.

Synopsis 
The story of the show follows the stories of to warring families - the Ajmeras and the Parekhs.

Susheel Parekh (Prachi Tehlan) is the 51st child of the Parekh family where all female members were killed years ago in a road accident. Susheel grows up with her father Mehul, her grandfather, and two uncles who believe she is auspicious. The accident had been planned by Leela Ajmera who wanted to take revenge from Mehul for having rejected her daughter Kiran. The Parekhs move away to Surat to start a new life.

Years later, Susheel grows up to be a strong woman encouraged by her family. Satya Ajmera (Namish Taneja) is Leela's grandson. Satya and Susheel run into each other in Surat and get into a fight where Satya is hurt. Wanting to get back at the girl who hurt her grandson, Leela sets out to look for her unaware that she is Mehul's daughter.

Cast

Main
 Namish Taneja as Satya Ajmera, Susheel's husband, Leela's grandson. He is a handsome and arrogant guy. He is much loved and valued by his family. He can’t see anyone better than him.
 Prachi Tehlan as Susheel Parekh Ajmera; Satya's wife, 51st child of the Parekh family, a sweet, loving and simple girl, who is more masculine in her mannerisms and interests.

 Rajshri Rani as Sarthi Mishra, also known as Fighter Didi, Susheel's kushti trainer, a self-defence trainer

Recurring
 Kavita Vaid  as Leela Ajmera, Satya and Vishu's grandmother
 Priyank Tatariya as Mehul Parekh, Susheel's father
 Pallavi Bharti as Kali Ajmera, Leela’s youngest daughter-in-law and Satya’s mother
 Neha Yadav as Sejal Ajmera, Vishu's wife
 Sidharth Banerjee as Sid
 Anwar Fatehan as Banke Parekh, Susheel's grandfather
 Nabeel Ahmed as Jiggy, Satya's cousin
 Puneet Panjwani as Naresh Parekh, Susheel's maternal uncle
 Jai Vats as Nitish Parekh, Susheel's paternal uncle
 Komal Dhillon as Kiran Ajmera, Leela's daughter who was rejected by Mehul
 Akshitta Arora as Jhano, Leela's domestic help
 Poonam Pandey as Soumya
 Urmimala Sinha Roy as Susheel's friend

Development

On 23 October 2017, the first promo of the show was released, with the opening song Khushkhabri Hai Papa. On 28 October 2017, the second promo of the show was released, with the title song of Ikyawann. The shooting for the show began in June 2017 at Manek Chowk, Ahmedabad, Gujarat. The college scenes were shot in St. Xavier's College at Navrangpura, Ahmedabad. Namish had talked about his college life character and he adds, "He is the most handsome guy in the college. Since he doesn't want to join his father's business, he keeps failing in his exams."

References

External links 
 Ikyawann Steaming on Hotstar
 

Hindi-language television shows
Indian drama television series
StarPlus original programming
2017 Indian television series debuts
Television shows set in Gujarat
2018 Indian television series endings